L'Olimpiade is an opera libretto in three acts by Metastasio originally written for an operatic setting by Antonio Caldara of 1733. Metastasio’s plot vaguely draws upon the narrative of "The Trial of the Suitors" provided from Book 6 of The Histories of Herodotus, which had previously been the base for Apostolo Zeno's libretto Gli inganni felici (1695). The story, set in Ancient Greece at the time of the Olympic Games, is about amorous rivalry and characters' taking places to gain the loved one. The story ends with the announcement of two marriages.

Background
Metastasio, as Imperial court poet at the court of Vienna, was requested to write the libretto to help celebrate the birthday of Empress Elisabeth Christine of Brunswick-Wolfenbüttel in 1733.  The court composer Caldara was assigned to compose the music. The libretto attracted attention immediately and productions were soon mounted across Europe. Metastasio himself commented to Saverio Mattei that L’Olimpiade had been "performed and repeated in all the theatres of Europe". Indeed, it ranks with Metastasio's Demofoonte and Didone abbandonata, which were excelled in popularity only by Artaserse and Alessandro nell'Indie. The popularity of L’Olimpiade may subsequently have prompted Metastasio’s La Nitteti, a twin drama in several respects.

Synopsis
Place: Ancient Greece
Time: During the Olympic Games

Act 1
Megacles arrives in Sicyon just in time to enter the Olympic Games under the name of Lycidas, a friend who once saved his life. Unknown to Megacles, Lycidas is in love with Aristaea, whose hand is to be offered to the winner of the games by her father, King Cleisthenes. Lycidas, once betrothed to Princess Argene of Crete, is unaware that Megacles and Aristaea already love each other, and he subsequently tells his friend of the prize. Aristaea and Megacles greet each other fondly, but Megacles now feels bound by his promise to compete as Lycidas. Meanwhile, Argene arrives in Olympia disguised as a shepherdess, to win back Lycidas.

Act 2
Megacles wins the games, confesses the truth to Aristaea and departs, broken-hearted. When Lycidas comes to claim her, Aristaea reproaches him, as does the disguised Argene, much to his dismay. Amyntas, tutor to Lycidas, reports that Megacles has drowned himself, and King Cleisthenes, apprised of the deception, banishes Lycidas.

Act 3
Argene prevents the desperate Aristaea from suicide, Megacles is rescued by a fisherman, and Lycidas contemplates the assassination of the king. Aristaea pleads mercy for Lycidas and Argene offers herself in his place; as proof that she is a princess, she shows Cleisthenes a chain given her by Lycidas. He recognizes it as belonging to his son, abandoned in infancy to forestall the prophecy that he would kill his father. Lycidas, reinstated, accepts Argene, leaving his sister to Megacles.

Other settings of the libretto
More than 60 baroque and classical composers used the libretto for their own settings. The first composer to reuse the libretto was Antonio Vivaldi in Venice in 1734. This was followed by Giovanni Battista Pergolesi's famous version in 1735. Although Pergolesi’s initial setting for Rome was not immediately successful, the number of subsequent stagings and extant manuscripts have particularly associated his name with this drama. In 1748 Baldassare Galuppi’s version premiered to resounding success in Milan and the opera is now regarded as his most successful opera seria. In 1765 Thomas Arne, who "still nursed the hope of achieving success in Italian opera", persuaded the directors of The King's Theatre in London to produce his own setting of the opera, which turned out however to be a complete failure. The libretto was also the source for one of Josef Mysliveček's finest dramatic works (1778, Naples). and a popular success for Antonio Sacchini in Padua 1763. Johann Nepomuk Poissl's  Der Wettkampf zu Olympia, oder Die Freunde (1815) was the first German-language setting and his version enjoyed occasional revivals during the nineteenth century.

Mozart set Cleisthenes' last aria twice, first for Aloysia Weber (KV. 294) and latter for a subscription concert by Ludwig Fischer (K 512). Beethoven set the duet "Ne' giorni tuoi felici" for tenor, soprano and orchestra in 1802 – 1803 (WoO 93).

List of notable settings
The following is a list of the most notable operas that subsequently utilized Metastasio's libretto in chronological order of first performance:

 Antonio Caldara, L'Olimpiade, Vienna, 1733
 Antonio Vivaldi, L'Olimpiade, Venice, Teatro Sant'Angelo, 1734
 Giovanni Battista Pergolesi, L'Olimpiade, Rome, 1735
 Leonardo Leo, L'Olimpiade, Naples, 1737
 Baldassare Galuppi, L'Olimpiade, Milan, 1748
 Davide Perez, L'Olimpiade, Lisbon, 1753
 Johann Adolf Hasse, L'Olimpiade, Dresden, 1756
 Tommaso Traetta,  L'Olimpiade, Verona, 1758 
 Niccolò Jommelli, L'Olimpiade, Stuttgart, 1761
 Niccolò Piccinni, L'Olimpiade, Rome, 1761 
 Vincenzo Manfredini, L'Olimpiade, Moscow, 1762
 Antonio Sacchini, L'Olimpiade, Padua, 1763
 Florian Leopold Gassmann, L'Olimpiade, Vienna, 1764
 Thomas Arne, L'Olimpiade, London, 1765
 Giuseppe Sarti, L'Olimpiade, Florence, 1778
 Josef Mysliveček, L'Olimpiade, Naples, Teatro San Carlo, 4 November 1778 
 Luigi Cherubini, L'Olimpiade, Venice, 1783
 Domenico Cimarosa, L'Olimpiade, Vicenza, 10 July 1784 
 Giovanni Paisiello, L'Olimpiade, Naples, Teatro San Carlo, 20 January 1786
 Johann Friedrich Reichardt, L’olimpiade, Berlin, Kgl, 2 Oct 1791
 Gaetano Donizetti, Olimpiade, (1817, incomplete)

Recordings

 Vivaldi: L'Olimpiade (Vivaldi), recording on CD - Rinaldo Alessandrini (Conductor) - Concerto Italiano - Cast: Sara Mingardo (Licida), Roberta Invernizzi (Megacle), Sonia Prina (Aristea), Marianna Kulikova (Argene), Laura Giordano (Aminta), Riccardo Novaro (Clistene), Sergio Foresti (Alcandro) - Naïve Records, Vivaldi Edition
 Pergolesi: L'Olimpiade (Pergolesi), video recording – 2011 Teatro Valeria Moriconi, Iesi – Alessandro De Marchi (Conductor), Academia Montis Regalis, Mondavi; Italo Nunziata (stage director) – Cast: Raúl Giménez (Clistene), Lyubov Petrova (Aristea), Yetzabel Arias Fernández (Argene), Jennifer Rivera (Licida), Sofia Soloviy (Megacie), Antonio Lozano (Aminta), Milena Storti (Alcandro) – Arthaus Musik Cat. 101 650 (DVD)
 Galuppi: L'Olimpiade (Galuppi), premiere recording on video DVD - 2006 Teatro Malibran, Venice - Andrea Marcon (Conductor), Venice Baroque Orchestra, Dominique Poulange (stage director) - Cast: Mark Tucker, Ruth Rosique, Roberta Invernizzi, Romina Basso - Dynamic Cat. 33545

References
Notes

Sources
George Loomis, "Metastatio's Olympians", Opera (London), Vol. 63, No. 5, May 2012, pp. 541–545.

External links
1733 libretto at Google Books
Synopsis at The Aris Christoffelis Voice Page
 Libretto, Vivaldi version
Libretto, Caldara version
1784 libretto (Cimarosa version) at Internet Archive

Libretti by Metastasio
1733 operas
Ancient Olympic Games
Olympic Games in fiction
Operas set in ancient Greece
Operas by Antonio Caldara